Cyperus bipartitus, commonly known as slender flatsedge, river cyperus, or the shining flatsedge, is a common species of sedge. The name "slender flatsedge" also applies to Cyperus gracilis.

Distribution and habitat

Description
There may be a one to three thin, short leaves around the base of the plant. The inflorescence is one to two centimeters long and holds several flat spikelets. These may be surrounded by long, leaflike bracts. Each spikelet contains flowers covered by dark reddish brown bracts. The achene fruit is a black disc about a millimeter wide.

References

External links
Photo gallery

bipartitus
Freshwater plants
Plants described in 1836